Press Hit Play  is a Filipino boy band, consisting of CHRLS, Yuuki, JP, and Sev. They were formerly named Power House Philippines but with a mononym of PHP. The group was originally formed in 2018 but disbanded, then reformed three years later in 2021.

Career
Press Hit Play traced their connections as solo performers or part of previous cover groups in the country's P-pop community landscape. A history of countless border-crossing opportunities sharpened them and allowed winning international awards. They underwent training for at least two years. Some of the members  is not new in the entertainment industry. JP Soliva and CHRLS Rodriguez were former trainees of ShowBT Entertainment. CHRLS had also trained in JU Entertainment while JP had also trained in RBW Entertainment.

2021: Formation and debut 
On June 28 Press Hit Play shared a post on social media, and continued to share posts from its agency's social media account accounts their pre- debut single and debut date. On July 2, Press Hit Play changed their name on social media into Press Hit Play from PHP. On July 16, they released a first pre-debut single "Galakbay" and a pre-debut single album "PHP". On August 6, Press Hit Play officially debuted with the single "WIN", first released on digital platforms and later released their first music video on its YouTube channel. It is an anthem of encouragement and inspiration from their heartwarming brotherhood formed from former rivalry.

2022: Official comeback, Yukito and Zi.O's departure 
On January 21, the group made their first official comeback. The group premieres their official come back music video "Tell Me". It was inspired by a Walt Disney movie and written about a person who is in love. Lyrically, ‘Tell Me’ was built-around the story of a person who is hopelessly in love. "Tell Me" music video features “retro-pop stylings of the ‘80s sound”.

On April 10, Press Hit Play performed at the first-ever P-pop Convention (PPOP Con) at Araneta City together with other Pinoy pop artists.

On April 25, it was announced that Yukito was leaving the group, it was also said that the group would still continue as a five-member group and would release a new comeback single. On July 13, Press Hit and Play became a four-member group when Zi.O, the main rapper and lead dancer left the group in pursuit of his well-being. With his departure, Press Hit Play became the only active male Filipino boy group with four members.

On July 15, the group took part on the "TUGATOG: The Filipino Music Festival 2022" alongside other Filipino idol groups.

2022: A year since debut 

On September 30, Press Hit Play released their single "Sambit". A song about the group journey, struggles and an inspiration to move forward and reach their dreams.

On October 21, Press Hit Play released their single "Forever Young". It is a song about making the most out of life at any age. The group had their first live stage performance of their single "Forever Young" on the "POPstival 2022: KPOP meets PPOP" few hours after it was released.

On November 30, the group received their first ever award "PPOP Male Stars of the Night" at "The 7th Philippine Pop - PPOP AWARDS 2022".

On December 6, Press Hit Play bagged their second award "Most Promising PPOP Group of the Year” at the "4th Philippine Faces of Success 2023".

2023: Present 
Press Hit Play has started the year 2023 with music releases. After the group released their "Forever Young" music video, they unveiled two another singles - "MNLUV" and "BALARAW".

On February 26, the group performed at "GMA Kapuso Foundation's Sagip Dugtong Buhay Bloodletting Project".

Members
Current
 CHRLS  – lead vocalist, songwriter
 JP – lead vocalist, lead dancer, songwriter, and producer
 Sev – main vocalist 
 Yuuki – main dancer, choreographer

Former
 Yukito (2021-2022)
 Zi.O (2021-2022)

Pre-debut
 J.O (2020)

Discography

Singles

Filmography

Music videos

2020s

Awards and nominations

References 



Filipino boy bands
Filipino pop music groups
Musical groups from Metro Manila
Musical groups established in 2018
2021 establishments in the Philippines
English-language singers from the Philippines